Empire Arrow was a 3,766 ton tanker  which was built in 1945 for the Ministry of War Transport. She was renamed British Bugler in 1947. In 1958 she was renamed Montmajour and in 1963 was renamed Mantinia, serving until 1978 when she was laid up. She was scrapped in 1981.

History
Empire Arrow was built by J.L. Thompson and Sons Ltd, Sunderland. She was yard number 641, launched on 27 April 1945 and completed in October of that year. She was built for the Ministry of War Transport and placed under the management of the British Tanker Company. In 1947, Empire Arrow was sold to her managers and renamed British Bugler. She served with them for a further eleven years and in 1958 was sold to the Compagnie d'Armement Maritime, Djibouti who renamed her Montmajour. In 1963, she was sold to the Greek Tanker Shipping Co, Piraeus and renamed Mantinia. She was operated under the management of C Diamantis. On 1 January 1978, Mantinia was laid up in Piraeus and in June 1978 she was scrapped at Kynosoúra.

Official number and code letters
Official Numbers were a forerunner to IMO Numbers.

Empire Arrow had the UK Official Number 180161 and used the Code Letters GKFZ.

Further reading

References

 

Ships built on the River Wear
1945 ships
Empire ships
Ministry of War Transport ships
World War II tankers
Merchant ships of the United Kingdom
Merchant ships of Djibouti
Merchant ships of Greece